Cryptandra gemmata is a species of flowering plant in the family Rhamnaceae and is endemic to the far north of the Northern Territory. It is a shrub with clustered linear leaves and white to creamy-white, tube-shaped flowers.

Description
The upper surface of the leaves is glabrous and the lower surface is rarely visible. The petals protrude  beyond the sepal tube, and form a hood over the stamens.

Taxonomy and naming
Cryptandra gemmata was first formally described in 2004 by Anthony Bean in the journal Austrobaileya from specimens collected east of Jabiru in 1989. The specific epithet (gemmata) means "provided with buds", referring to the development of buds around existing flowers and fruits.

Distribution and habitat
This cryptandra grows on sandstone pavement with little or no soil and is only known from near Jabiru in the far north of the Northern Territory.

References

gemmata
Rosales of Australia
Flora of the Northern Territory
Plants described in 2004
Taxa named by Anthony Bean